Gina Athena Ulysse is a Haitian-American anthropologist, feminist, poet, performance artist and activist. Professor Ulysse earned her Ph.D. in anthropology from the University of Michigan. She is currently a full professor of anthropology at Wesleyan University in Middletown, Connecticut.  She joined the Feminist Studies department at UC Santa Cruz in Fall 2020. Ulysse is most known for her 2015 book Why Haiti Needs New Narratives: A Post-Quake Chronicle.

She is a feminist artist-anthropologist-activist, and self-described Post-Zora Interventionist. An interdisciplinary methodologist, her research interests culminate at the intersections of geopolitics, historical representations and the dailiness of Black diasporic conditions.

Publications 
"Because When God Is Too Busy: Haiti, Me, & The World" is a one-woman show written and performed by Ulysse that combines history, theory, and personal narrative in spoken word with Vodou chants to reflect on childhood memories, social justice, spirituality, and the incessant dehumanization of Haitians. Because When God is Too Busy: Haiti, me & THE WORLD was published in book form on April 7, 2017. The book won the 2018 Connecticut Center for the book Award in poetry, and was longlisted for a 2017 PEN Open Book
Award.

Her first monograph, based on her dissertation research, Downtown Ladies: Informal Commercial Importing, A Haitian Anthropologist and Self-Making in Jamaica (Chicago, 2007), received honorable mention in the Caribbean Studies Association Book Prize. Her second book, Why Haiti Needs New Narratives: A Post Quake Chronicle (Wesleyan, 2015) was published as a tri-lingual edition in English, Kreyòl and French. In addition to several anthologies, her prose and other short form writing has appeared in the referred journals: AnthroNow, Feminist Studies, Gastronomica, Journal of Haitian Studies, Liminalities, PoemMemoirStory, Souls, and Transition Magazine.

Education 
Ulysse holds a BA from Upsala College, an MA from University of Michigan, and a PHD from University of Michigan.

Awards 
In 2010, she was awarded the Ronald C. Foreman Jr. Lecture Award for Academic Excellence and Social Responsibility by the African-American Studies Program at University of Florida. In 2015, she was the recipient of Wesleyan's Binzwanger Prize for Excellence in Teaching, as well as the Haitian Studies Association's (HSA) Excellence in Scholarship awards. In 2018, for recognition of her various works in the public sphere, she was awarded the Anthropology in the Media Award (AIME) by the American Anthropological Association.

References

American anthropologists
American women anthropologists
American women poets
Haitian anthropologists
Haitian women anthropologists
Living people
Wesleyan University faculty
University of Michigan alumni
1966 births
American women academics
21st-century American women